The Cholmondeley Ladies (pronounced  ) is an early-17th-century English oil painting depicting two women seated upright and side by side in bed, each holding a baby.  Measuring , it was painted on four joined panels of oak, probably in the first decade of the 17th century. According to an inscription in gold lettering to the bottom left of the painting, it shows "Two Ladies of the Cholmondeley Family, Who were born the same day, Married the same day, And brought to Bed the same day."

At first sight, the two women and their two babies appear almost identical, each mother wearing similarly elaborate clothing decorated with lace and jewellery, each baby swaddled in a christening robe and held at a similar angle. On closer inspection, numerous details of the clothing, jewellery, and facial characteristics of the two pairs are seen to differ. The women could be sisters and possibly even twins but their differing eye colours demonstrate that they are not identical twins. The pose is not known to have been used in any other British painting, but was frequently seen in contemporary funerary art.

The artist is unknown, but the work is thought to have been painted near the Cholmondeley family's estates in Cheshire. It is painted on a predominantly white chalk ground, bound with animal glue size, and then primed with lead white and chalk bound with oil.  Most of the painting was made using an additive technique, with areas of colours sketched out and then details and shading added in layers, but the faces were painted wet-in-wet.  It was most recently cleaned and restored by the Tate in 1959, including restoration of areas of flaking paint. The painting was in the collection of Thomas Cholmondeley, the third son of Sir Hugh Cholmondeley and his wife Lady Mary Cholmondeley (née Holford), who was an ancestor of Baron Delamere. John T. Hopkins (1991) suggests that the portrait shows two daughters of Sir Hugh and Lady Mary Cholmondeley – Lettice, first wife of Sir Richard Grosvenor, 1st Baronet (and mother of Sir Richard Grosvenor, 2nd Baronet), and Mary Calveley (died 1616), wife of George Calveley.

It was presented to the Tate Gallery by an anonymous donor in 1955.

References

John T. Hopkins, '"Such a Twin Likeness there was in the Pair": An Investigation into the Painting of the Cholmondeley Sisters', reprinted from Transactions of the Historic Society of Lancashire and Cheshire [for the Year 1991], vol.141, pp. 1–37, referred to in The Cholmondeley Ladies, Tate Gallery, texts
 The Cholmondeley Ladies, Tate Gallery, work
 The Perception of Symmetry, Michael Bird, Tate etc., Issue 1, Summer 2004.
 Google Art Project
 The Cholmondeley Ladies, technical information, Tate Gallery

English paintings
1600s paintings
Collection of the Tate galleries
Cholmondeley family
Portraits by English artists
17th-century portraits
Portraits of women